Asadollah Mihani (born 21 May 1918, date of death unknown) was an Iranian weightlifter. He competed in the men's lightweight event at the 1948 Summer Olympics.

References

1918 births
Year of death missing
Iranian male weightlifters
Olympic weightlifters of Iran
Weightlifters at the 1948 Summer Olympics
Place of birth missing